Claude Gouzzie  (1873–1907) was a French second baseman in Major League Baseball. He played in one game for the  St. Louis Browns of the American League on July 22, 1903.

External links

1873 births
1907 deaths
Major League Baseball second basemen
St. Louis Browns players
Major League Baseball players from France
French emigrants to the United States